A creature actor or creature performer is an actor who depicts a creature of radically different appearance than their own using a creature suit, with or without prosthetic makeup, mechanical puppetry and computer-generated visual effects. It is similar to the role of a suit actor in Japanese tokusatsu films.

List of creature actors

 Andy Serkis
 Bolaji Badejo
 Brian Steele
 Camden Toy
 Dane DiLiegro
 Derek Mears
 Doug Jones
 Douglas Tait
 Edd Osmond
 Haruo Nakajima
 Ian Whyte
 Javier Botet
 Joonas Suotamo
 Kevin Peter Hall
 Lon Chaney Jr.
 Peter Mayhew
 Ray Harryhausen
 Robert Strange
 Terry Notary
 Tom Woodruff Jr.
 Warwick Davis

See also
 Motion capture
 Physical theatre
 Stunt performer

References

Acting